The Conclave is a 2006 Canadian/German film production directed by Christoph Schrewe. The script was written by  Paul Donovan.

Plot

The plot centers on the conclave of 1458, which took place five years after the fall of Constantinople to the Turks. The story material was sourced from a diary written by Silvius Aeneas Piccolomini, the only cardinal to ever record the secret proceedings of a papal conclave, and who was himself elected Pope Pius II in that Conclave. The Conclave hinges on the drama surrounding a 27-year-old Spaniard, Cardinal Rodrigo Borgia (later Pope Alexander VI) as he struggles to save both his career and his life.

Cast

See also

List of historical drama films

External links 

 
Official website

2006 films
2006 drama films
2000s historical drama films
Canadian drama films
German historical drama films
English-language Canadian films
English-language German films
Films about popes
Drama films based on actual events
Films set in Vatican City
Films set in the 1450s
2000s Canadian films
2000s German films